Leonard Soloman Saring is  an Indian politician. He was a Member of Parliament  representing Sikkim in the Rajya Sabha the upper house of India's Parliament as member  of the  Indian National Congress.

References

1942 births
Living people
Rajya Sabha members from Sikkim
Indian National Congress politicians